Perséphone (Persephone) is a musical work (mélodrame) for speaker, solo singers, chorus, dancers and orchestra with music by Igor Stravinsky and a libretto by André Gide.

It was first performed under the direction of the composer at the Opéra in Paris, on 30 April 1934 in a double bill with the ballet Diane de Poitiers by Jacques Ibert. The premiere was staged by the ballet company of Ida Rubinstein, with Rubinstein herself dancing and speaking the part of Persephone and the tenor René Maison singing Eumolphe.

It was also performed at the Teatro Colón in Buenos Aires under Stravinsky himself in 1936 with Victoria Ocampo, an Argentinean preeminent writer and intellectual, and then in Rio de Janeiro. It was reprised at the Colón in 1995 with China Zorrilla under Pedro Ignacio Calderón.

Other choreographed versions have included those of George Balanchine, Kurt Jooss (1955), Frederick Ashton (1961), and Pina Bausch (1965). (Martha Graham's Persephone is accompanied by Stravinsky's Symphony in C.)

It was recorded by Stravinsky himself with Vera Zorina and also under André Cluytens (with Nicolai Gedda, 1955, Paris), Sir Andrew Davis (with Paul Groves, London), Michael Tilson Thomas (with Stuart Neill, 1999, San Francisco), and Esa-Pekka Salonen (with Andrew Staples, 2018, Finnish National Opera).  A 2012 production at the Teatro Real, Madrid, directed by Peter Sellars with Teodor Currentzis conducting, was released on Blu-ray, paired with Tchaikovsky's Iolanta, Op.69, from the same 2012 production.

Roles
Eumolpe, tenor René Maison
Perséphone, ballerina Ida Rubinstein
Demetra-Dometer, ballerina Krakowska
Mercure, dancer Anatole Viltzak
Pluton, dancer
Démophoon, dancer

Synopsis
The melodrama tells the story of the Greek goddess Persephone, in three parts:

References

Sources

Holden, Amanda (Ed.). The New Penguin Opera Guide. New York: Penguin Putnam, 2001.

Further reading
Levitz, Tamara: Modernist Mysteries: Perséphone. Oxford and New York: Oxford University Press, 2012. 

Persephone
Operas by Igor Stravinsky
Operas
French-language operas
1934 operas
Melodramas
Compositions with a narrator
Operas based on classical mythology
Opera world premieres at the Paris Opera